Carter's Tavern is a historic inn and tavern located at Paces, Halifax County, Virginia. It dates to the late-18th and early-19th century and consists of a two-story, double-pile, side-hall-plan main frame section and an earlier 1 1/2-story frame wing on the west end. Both the main part and the wing are covered by gable roofs with simple box cornices.  The building was thoroughly restored in 1972. Carter's Tavern remained in operation until 1843.

It was listed on the National Register of Historic Places in 1974.

References

Drinking establishments on the National Register of Historic Places in Virginia
Federal architecture in Virginia
Buildings and structures in Halifax County, Virginia
National Register of Historic Places in Halifax County, Virginia